Angelos Grammenos (Greek: Άγγελος Γραμμένος; March 15, 1958) is a Greek actor, television director and singer. Born on the island of Corfu, he was particularly popular during the 1980s.

Grammenos is the son of Hrysanthi and Dionysios Grammenos, a WWI/II veteran.

He studied at the Drama School of the "Professional Theatre School of Athens" (Επαγγελματική Σχολή Θεάτρου Αθηνών). He has played in many Greek films, television series, and theatre plays.

Grammenos plays the saxophone.

References

External links 
 
 
 

Living people
Actors from Corfu
Musicians from Corfu
Greek male television actors
20th-century Greek male actors
Modern Greek-language singers
Greek male film actors
Greek male stage actors
1958 births